Lauri Lehtinen (19 August 1927 – 23 March 2016) was a Finnish footballer. He played in 26 matches for the Finland national football team from 1952 to 1960. He was also named in Finland's squad for the Group 2 qualification tournament for the 1954 FIFA World Cup.

References

External links
 

1927 births
2016 deaths
Finnish footballers
Finland international footballers
Place of birth missing
Association footballers not categorized by position
Mestaruussarja players